Dragon Hill, la colina del dragón is a 2002 Spanish animated adventure fantasy film directed by Ángel Izquierdo and written and produced by Antonio Zurera Aragón. It won the Goya Award for Best Animated Film at the 17th Goya Awards.

Plot

Voice cast
Elvira García as Elfy
Esperanza García as Kevin
Antonio García Moral as Septimus
Carmen Capdet as Maud
Nuria Cepero as Gala
Vicente Gil as Ken
Ariana Jimenez as Vivien
Reinaldo Coello as Ethelbert
Gloria Gonzalez as Speaker
Joaquín Gómez as Newton / Cook 1 / Viking
Francesc Rocamora as Montesquieu
Ferran Calvo as Cook 2 and Bear
Juan Miguel Diez as Cook 3 and Captain
Robert Paterson as Director

Release 
The film was released theatrically on 20 December 2002 in Spain. Released in the Netherlands on 9 October 2003, the film grossed $678,228. It was re-released in Poland on 26 January 2007 and grossed $238,107.

Accolades 
At the 17th Goya Awards, Dragon Hill won Best Animated Film and the song "Un Lugar Más Allá" by Emilio Alquézar was nominated for Best Original Song, but lost to "Sevillana Para Carlos" by Roque Baños for Salomé.

Sequels 
The film was followed by two sequels,  (The Magic Cube) in 2006 and El corazón del roble (The Heart of the Oak) in 2012.

References

External links 
 (in Spanish; archived)

2002 films
2002 animated films
Animated films about dragons
Spanish animated fantasy films
Spanish fantasy films
2000s Spanish films
Spanish fantasy adventure films
2000s fantasy adventure films